Grove Street station may refer to:

Grove Street station (NJ Transit), a former railway station in East Orange, New Jersey
Grove Street station (Newark Light Rail), a light rail station in Bloomfield, New Jersey
Grove Street station (PATH), a rapid transit station in Jersey City, New Jersey

See also
Grove Street (disambiguation)